Goose is an American jam band from Norwalk, Connecticut. The band consists of Peter Anspach, Jeff Arevalo, Ben Atkind, Rick Mitarotonda, and Trevor Weeks.

History
Goose was formed in 2014 by singer and guitarist Rick Mitarotonda, drummer Ben Atkind, bassist Trevor Weeks, and Jon Lombardi. Rick, Trevor, and Ben had previously played together in the band Vasudo. Multi-instrumentalist Peter Anspach joined the band in 2017, followed by percussionist Jeff Arevalo in 2020.

The band garnered praise for their performance at the 2019 edition of The Peach Music Festival, which gained them popularity in the jam band scene and has been viewed over 420,000 times on YouTube/Facebook as of March 2023. In January 2020 the band played two well received late night performances at Dead & Company's Playing in the Sand event in Mexico. The band's rise in popularity resulted in booking larger venues for their 2020 tour, such as the Bowery Ballroom in New York City, but they canceled the tour after the COVID-19 pandemic shut down live music performances worldwide. Instead, the band livestreamed eight concerts without an audience from a barn in Connecticut in June 2020, called the Bingo Tour. The Bingo Tour grossed more than $100,000 for the band.

Goose released a 20-minute jam version of the Vampire Weekend song "2021" in February 2021 at the request of Vampire Weekend singer Ezra Koenig, who is a fan of the group.

Following the pandemic, Goose booked a series of performances at large venues in 2021 and 2022, such as Radio City Music Hall in New York,  Red Rocks Amphitheatre in Morrison, Colorado and their first-ever arena concerts at the Mohegan Sun Arena in their native Connecticut. On June 24 and 25, 2022, Goose played two shows at Radio City Music Hall. The June 25 concert featured appearances by Father John Misty and Phish guitarist and lead singer Trey Anastasio, the latter of whom played with Goose for their entire third set. Goose and the Trey Anastasio Band performed together in an eight date co-headlining tour in November 2022.

In January 2023, Goose was the top billed special guest at Dead & Company's Playing in the Sand festival in Mexico, headlining on the main stage on the second night. During their January 15 performance, the band was joined by Bob Weir for three songs at the end of the first set. Atkind and Arevalo went on to play with the Rhythm Devils during "Drums" at Dead & Company's next shows. 

Anspach personally mixes the band's live performances for release shortly after the band finishes their concerts.

Musical style and influences
Goose have been regularly compared to jam bands such as Phish and Umphrey's McGee, both of which the band's members count as influences. Goose describes themselves as an "indie groove" band, but does acknowledge their jam band influences; speaking to Uproxx music critic Steven Hyden, guitarist Rick Mitarotonda said "Frankly there are a lot of cheesy and not great jam bands that have existed over time. Obviously, we’ve strayed away from that for obvious reasons, or tried to at least. But, I mean, we are a jam band. We jam, and we improvise a lot." Hyden wrote that Goose's indie rock and trance influences contrast the funk and progressive rock influences of Phish and the folk, jazz, and blues influences of the Grateful Dead.

Personnel

Band members
Current members
Peter Anspach – keyboards, guitar, vocals (2017–present)
Jeff Arevalo – percussion, vocals (2020–present)
Ben Atkind – drums (2014–present)
Rick Mitarotonda – guitar, vocals (2014–present)
Trevor Weekz – bass, poetry (2014–present)
Past members
Peter Castaldi – guitar
Chris "Doc" Enright - keyboards
Kris Yunker - keyboards
Aaron Hagele - percussion

Discography

Studio albums
Moon Cabin (2016)
Night Lights EP (2020)
Shenanigans Nite Club (2021)
Dripfield (2022)
Undecided EP (2022)

Live albums
Alive and Well (2020)
Bingo Tour (2020)
2019.11.16 Buffalo, NY (2021)
2020.10.03 Swanzey, NH (2021)
Ted Tapes 2021 (2021)
2021.11.21 Denver, CO (2021)
2022.03.12 Philadelphia, PA (2022)
2022.12.16 Broomfield, CO (2023)
2022.12.31 Cincinnati, OH (2023)

Singles
"Sinnerman" (2021)
"Hungersite" (2022) - No. 12 Adult Alternative Airplay

References

External links 
 Goose official website

Jam bands